Hippolyte Lippens (16 October 1847 – 31 December 1906) was a lawyer, manager of sugar factories and a Belgian liberal politician. He was a son of Auguste Lippens, burgomaster of Moerbeke-Waas, and he married in 1873, with Louise de Kerckhove de Denterghem, a daughter of the burgomaster of Ghent Charles de Kerchove de Denterghem.

He became burgomaster of Ghent (1882–1895), a member of parliament (1882–1886 and 1889–1890) and senator (1900–1906) for the liberal party. During his tenure as a burgomaster, the renovation of the Neerscheldewijk (current Vlaanderenstraat, Limburgstraat and Henegouwenstraat) in Ghent was started according to the Paris model.

See also 
 Liberal Party
Politics of Belgium
Liberal Party (Belgium) politicians

Sources 
 Hippolyte Lippens (Liberal Archive)

1847 births
1906 deaths
Mayors of Ghent